This article lists the in the water and on the water forms of aquatic sports for 2019.

Aquatics

FINA
 July 12–28: 2019 World Aquatics Championships in  Gwangju
  won the gold medal tally. The  won the overall medal tally.
 August 5–18: 2019 FINA World Masters Championships in  Gwangju
 For results, click here.
 August 20–25: 2019 FINA World Junior Swimming Championships in  Budapest
 The  won both the gold and overall medal tallies.

Ligue Européenne de Natation
 May 10–12: 2019 European Synchronized Swimming Champions Cup in  St Petersburg
 Duet Technical/Free winners:  (Svetlana Romashina & Svetlana Kolesnichenko) (both)
 Team Technical/Free winners:  (both)
 Mixed Duet Technical/Free winners:  (Kristina Averina & Mikhail Vasilev) (both)
 Free Combination winners: 
 Team Highlight winners: 
 June 19–23: 2019 European Junior "Artistic" Synchronized Swimming Championships in  Prague
 Solo Technical/Free winners:  Tatiana Gayday (both)
 Duet Technical/Free winners:  (Kseniia Ladnaia & Elizaveta Minaeva) (both)
 Team Technical/Free winners:  (both)
 Mixed Duet Technical/Free winners:  (Kristina Averina & Mikhail Vasilev) (both)
 Free Combination winners: 
 Figures winner:  Vasilina Khandoshka 
 June 24–30: 2019 European Junior Diving Championships in  Kazan
 Level "A"
 1m Springboard:  Adrian Gio Abadia Garcia (m) /  Vitaliia Koroleva (f)
 3m Springboard:  Grigory Ivanov (m) /  Elizaveta Kuzina (f)
 Platform:  Ruslan Ternovoi (m) /  Iana Satina (f)
 Level "B"
 1m Springboard:  Carlos Taranu (m) /  Desharne Bent-Ashmeil (f)
 3m Springboard:  Roman Larin (m) /  Lotti Hubert (f)
 Platform:  Oleksii Sereda (m) /  Elizaveta Kanso (f)
 Other
 3m Synchronized SB:  (Grigory Ivanov & Ruslan Ternovoi) (m) /  (Uliana Kliueva & Vitaliia Koroleva) (f)
 10m Synchronized PF:  (Emil Ibragimov & Ruslan Ternovoi) (m) /  (Emily Martin & Andrea Spendolini-Sirieix) (f)
 Mixed Jump:  (Viktoriia Prosekova, Ruslan Ternovoi, Uliana Kliueva, & Grigory Ivanov)
 July 3–7: 2019 European Junior Swimming Championships in  Kazan
  won both the gold and overall medal tallies.
 August 5–11: 2019 European Diving Championships in  Kyiv
  won both the gold and overall medal tallies.
 December 4–8: 2019 European Short Course Swimming Championships in  Glasgow
  won both the gold and overall medal tallies.

2019 FINA Marathon Swim World Series
 February 16: MSWS #1 in  Doha
 Winners:  Florian Wellbrock (m) /  Ana Marcela Cunha (f)
 May 12: MSWS #2 in 
 Winners:  Marc-Antoine Olivier (m) /  Arianna Bridi (f)
 June 8: MSWS #3 in  Setúbal
 Winners:  Yohsuke Miyamoto (m) /  Ana Marcela Cunha (f)
 June 15: MSWS #4 in  Balatonfüred
 Men's 5 & 10 km winner:  Kristóf Rasovszky
 Women's 5 & 10 km winner:  Ana Marcela Cunha
 July 21: MSWS #5 in  Lac Saint-Jean
 Winners:  Kristóf Rasovszky (m) /  Rachele Bruni (f)
 August 3: MSWS #6 in  Lake Mégantic
 Winners:  Kristóf Rasovszky (m) /  Rachele Bruni (f)
 August 28: MSWS #7 in  Ohrid
 Winners:  Kirill Abrosimov (m) /  Ana Marcela Cunha (f)
 September 7: MSWS #8 in  Nantou City
 Winners:  Nicholas Sloman (m) /  Ana Marcela Cunha (f)
 September 29: MSWS #9 (final) in  Chun'an County (Hangzhou)
 Winners:  Ferry Weertman (m) /  Arianna Bridi (f)

2019 FINA Ultra Marathon Swim Series
 February 3: UMSS #1 in  Santa Fe
 Winners:  Francesco Ghettini (m) /  Barbara Pozzobon (f)
 February 9: UMSS #2 in  Rosario
 Winners:  Ivo Cassini (m) /  Cecilia Biagioli (f)
 July 27: UMSS #3 in  Lac Saint-Jean
 Winners:  Marcel Schouten (m) /  Morgane Dornic (f)
 August 24: UMSS #4 in  Ohrid
 Winners:  Axel Reymond (m) /  Alice Franco (f)
 August 31: UMSS #5 in  Novi Vinodolski
 Winners:  Edoardo Stochino (m) /  Angela Maurer (f)
 September 7: UMSS #6 (final) in  Capri-Naples
 Winners:  Andrea Bianchi (m) /  Barbara Pozzobon (f)

2019 FINA Diving World Series
 March 1 – 3: DWS #1 in  Sagamihara
 3m Springboard:  Xie Siyi (m) /  Shi Tingmao (f)
 10m Platform:  Yang Jian (m) /  Zhang Jiaqi (f)
 3m SB Synchronized:  (Cao Yuan & Xie Siyi) (m) /  (Shi Tingmao & Wang Han) (f)
 10m PF Synchronized:  (Cao Yuan & Chen Aisen) (m) /  (Zhang Jiaqi & LU Wei) (f)
 Mixed Synchronized:  (CHANG Yani & Yang Hao) (3m) /  (Lian Junjie & Si Yajie) (10m)
 March 7 – 9: DWS #2 in  Beijing
 3m Springboard:  Cao Yuan (m) /  Wang Han (f)
 10m Platform:  Yang Jian (m) /  Zhang Jiaqi (f)
 3m SB Synchronized:  (Cao Yuan & Xie Siyi) (m) /  (Wang Han & Shi Tingmao) (f)
 10m PF Synchronized:  (Chen Aisen & Cao Yuan) (m) /  (LU Wei & Zhang Jiaqi) (f)
 Mixed Synchronized:  (Yang Hao & CHANG Yani) (3m) /  (Si Yajie & Lian Junjie) (10m)
 April 26 – 28: DWS #3 in  Montreal
 3m Springboard:  Xie Siyi (m) /  Wang Han (f)
 10m Platform:  Tom Daley (m) /  LU Wei (f)
 3m SB Synchronized:  (Cao Yuan & Xie Siyi) (m) /  (Wang Han & Shi Tingmao) (f)
 10m PF Synchronized:  (Yang Hao & Lian Junjie) (m) /  (JO Jin-mi & Kim Mi-rae) (f)
 Mixed Synchronized:  (CHANG Yani & Yang Hao) (3m) /  (Lian Junjie & Si Yajie) (10m)
 May 10 – 12: DWS #4 in  Kazan
 3m Springboard:  Jack Laugher (m) /  Jennifer Abel (f)
 10m Platform:  Yang Hao (m) /  Kim Mi-rae (f)
 3m SB Synchronized:  (Oleh Kolodiy & Oleksandr Horshkovozov) (m) /  (LIN Shan & CHANG Yani) (f)
 10m PF Synchronized:  (Yang Hao & Lian Junjie) (m) /  (YUAN Haoyan & CHEN Yuxi) (f)
 Mixed Synchronized:  (Domonic Bedggood & Maddison Keeney) (3m) /  (DUAN Yu & ZHANG Minjie) (10m)
 May 17 – 19: DWS #5 (final) in  London
 3m Springboard:  Jack Laugher (m) /  Maddison Keeney (f)
 10m Platform:  Yang Hao (m) /  CHEN Yuxi (f)
 3m SB Synchronized:  (WANG Zongyuan & WU Luxian) (m) /  (Maddison Keeney & Anabelle Smith) (f)
 10m PF Synchronized:  (Tom Daley & Matty Lee) (m) /  (YUAN Haoyan & CHEN Yuxi) (f)
 Mixed Synchronized:  (Grace Reid & Tom Daley) (3m) /  (ZHANG Minjie & DUAN Yu) (10m)

2019 FINA Diving Grand Prix
 February 14 – 17: DGP #1 in  Rostock
 3m Springboard:  Martin Wolfram (m) /  WEI Ying (f)
 10m Platform:  Viktor Minibaev (m) /  Celina Toth (f)
 3m SB Synchronized:  (Lars Rüdiger & Patrick Hausding) (m) /  (OUYANG Yu & HU Jiahan) (f)
 10m PF Synchronized:  (ZHANG Peng & ZHANG Wenao) (m) /  (Yulia Timoshinina & Ekaterina Beliaeva) (f)
 Mixed Synchronized:  (Viktoriya Kesar & Stanislav Oliferchyk) (3m) /  (Christina Wassen & Florian Fandler) (10m)
 April 4 – 7: DGP #2 in  Calgary
 3m Springboard:  HUANG Bowen (m) /  Jennifer Abel (f)
 10m Platform:  WANG Zewei (m) /  XU Yijin (f)
 3m SB Synchronized:  (Philippe Gagné & François Imbeau-Dulac) (m) /  (Mélissa Citrini-Beaulieu & Jennifer Abel) (f)
 10m PF Synchronized:  (Randal Willars Valdez & José Balleza) (m) /  (Meaghan Benfeito & Caeli McKay) (f)
 Mixed Synchronized:  (François Imbeau-Dulac & Jennifer Abel) (3m) /  (XU Yijin & WANG Zewei) (10m)
 April 11 – 14: DGP #3 in  Mission Viejo
 3m Springboard:  Briadam Herrera (m) /  Hailey Herndandez (f)
 10m Platform:  Randal Willars Valdez (m) /  Melissa Wu (f)
 3m SB Synchronized:  (Jordan Houlden & Anthony Harding) (m) /  (Krysta Palmer & Alison Gibson) (f)
 10m PF Synchronized:  (José Balleza & Randal Willars Valdez) (m) /  (Phoebe Banks & Emily Martin) (f)
 Mixed Synchronized:  (Elena Bertocchi & Maicol Verzotto) (3m) /  (José Balleza & María Sánchez) (10m)
 June 7 – 9: DGP #4 in  Madrid
 3m Springboard:  Woo Ha-ram (m) /  WEI Ying (f)
 10m Platform:  YANG Ling (m) /  ZHANG Minjie (f)
 3m SB Synchronized:  (KIM Yeong-nam & Woo Ha-ram) (m) /  (Huang Xiaohui & WEI Ying) (f)
 10m PF Synchronized:  (YUAN Song & YANG Ling) (m) /  (MOON Na-yun & CHO Eun-bi) (f)
 June 14 – 16: DGP #5 in  Bolzano
 3m Springboard:  Sebastián Morales (m) /  WEI Ying (f)
 10m Platform:  YUAN Song (m) /  ZHANG Minjie (f)
 3m SB Synchronized:  (Daniel Restrepo Garcia & Sebastián Morales) (m) /  (Huang Xiaohui & WEI Ying) (f)
 10m PF Synchronized:  (YUAN Song & YANG Ling) (m) /  (Noemi Batki & Chiara Pellacani) (f)
 Mixed Synchronized:  (Alisa Kooi & Brodie Scapens) (3m) /  (Catalin Cozma & Antonia-Mihaela Pavel) (10m)
 June 21 – 24: DGP #6 in  Cairo
 3m Springboard:  Mohab Ishak (m) /  Maha Eissa (f)
 10m Platform:  Rafael Quintero (m) /  Maha Abdelsalam (f)
 3m SB Synchronized:  (Ammar Hassan & Youssef Ezzat) (m) /  (Habiba Shoeib & Maha Abdelsalam) (f; default)
 Men's 10m PF Synchronized winners:  (Youssef Ezzat & Mohamed Noaman)
 November 8 – 10: DGP #7 in  Gold Coast
 3m Springboard:  Wang Zongyuan (m) /  Chen Yiwen (f)
 10m Platform:  Lian Junjie (m) /  Si Yajie (f)
 3m SB Synchronized:  (Gabriel Gilbert Daim & Muhammad Syafiq Puteh) (m) /  (Jasmine Lai Pui Yee & Zhiayi Loh) (f; default)
 Men's 10m PF Synchronized winners:  (Jellson Jabillin & Hanis Jaya Surya) (m) /  (SI Yajie & Ren Qian) (f; default) 
 Mixed Synchronized:  (Muhammad Syafiq Puteh & Nur Dhabitah Binti Sabri) (3m)
 November 15 – 17: DGP #8 in  Kuala Lumpur
 3m Springboard:  Tze Liang Ooi (m) /  Huang Xiaohui (f)
 10m Platform:  YU Duan (m) /  Lin Shan (f)
 3m SB Synchronized:  (Chew Yiwei & Tze Liang Ooi) (m) /  (CHEN Yiwei & HUANG Xiaohui) (f)
 Men's 10m PF Synchronized winners:  (WANG Zewei & DUAN Yu) (m) /  (TANG Yixuan & DU Yinying) (f) 
 Mixed Synchronized:  (Ng Yan Yee & Muhammad Syafiq Puteh) (3m) /  (José Balleza & María Sánchez) (10m; default)
 November 22 – 24: DGP #9 (final) in 
 3m Springboard:  Tai Xiaohu (m) /  XIAOHUI Huang (f)
 10m Platform:  YU Duan (m) /  TANG Yixuan (f)
 3m SB Synchronized:  (Gwendal Bisch & Alexis Jandard) (m) /  (HUANG Xiaohui & WEI Yiang) (f)
 Men's 10m PF Synchronized winners:  (WANG Zewei & DUAN Yu) (m) /  (TANG Yixuan & DU Yinying) (f) 
 Mixed Synchronized:  (Jonathan Suckow & Michelle Heimberg) (3m) /  (José Balleza & María Sánchez) (10m; default)

2019 FINA Artistic Swimming World Series
 February 28 – March 3: ASWS #1 in  Paris
 Solo Technical/Free winners:  Yukiko Inui (both)
 Duet Technical/Free winners:  (Marta Fiedina & Anastasiya Savchuk) /  (Maryna Aleksiiva & Vladyslava Aleksiiva)
 Team Technical/Free winners:  / 
 Mixed Duet Technical/Free winners:  (Yumi Adachi & Atsushi Abe) (both)
 Free Combination winners: 
 Team Highlight winners: 
 April 4 – 7: ASWS #2 in  Alexandroupoli
 Solo Technical/Free winners:  Jacqueline Simoneau /  Marta Fiedina
 Duet Technical/Free winners:  (Marta Fiedina & Anastasiya Savchuk) /  (Maryna Aleksiiva & Vladyslava Aleksiiva)
 Team Technical/Free winners:  / 
 Mixed Duet Technical/Free winners:  (Yumi Adachi & Atsushi Abe) /  (Giorgio Minisini & Manila Flamini)
 Free Combination winners: 
 Team Highlight winners: 
 April 19 – 21: ASWS #3 in  Kazan
 Solo Technical/Free winners:  Svetlana Kolesnichenko /  Linda Cerruti
 Duet Technical/Free winners:  (Svetlana Romashina & Svetlana Kolesnichenko) (both)
 Team Technical/Free winners:  (both)
 Mixed Duet Technical/Free winners:  (Mayya Gurbanberdieva & Aleksandr Maltsev) (both)
 Free Combination winners: 
 Team Highlight winners: 
 April 27 – 29: ASWS #4 in  Tokyo
 Solo Technical/Free winners:  Svetlana Kolesnichenko /  Yukiko Inui
 Duet Technical/Free winners:  (Svetlana Romashina & Svetlana Kolesnichenko) (both)
 Team Technical/Free winners:  (both)
 Mixed Duet Technical/Free winners:  (Mayya Gurbanberdieva & Aleksandr Maltsev) (both)
 Free Combination winners: 
 Team Highlight winners: 
 May 4 – 6: ASWS #5 in  Beijing
 Solo Technical/Free winners:  Jacqueline Simoneau (both)
 Duet Technical/Free winners:  (Claudia Holzner & Jacqueline Simoneau) (both)
 Team Technical/Free winners:  / 
 Mixed Duet Technical/Free winners:  (Mayya Gurbanberdieva & Aleksandr Maltsev) (both)
 Free Combination winners: 
 Team Highlight winners: 
 May 24 – 26: ASWS #6 in  Greensboro
 Solo Technical/Free winners:  Yukiko Inui (both)
 Duet Technical/Free winners:  (Megumu Yoshida & Yukiko Inui) (both)
 Team Technical/Free winners:  (both)
 Mixed Duet Technical winners:  (Bill May & Natalia Cristina Vega Figueroa)
 Free Combination winners: 
 Team Highlight winners:  (default)
 May 30 – June 1: ASWS #7 in  Quebec City
 Solo Technical/Free winners:  Yukiko Inui (both)
 Duet Technical/Free winners:  (Sun Wenyan & Huang Xuechen) (both)
 Team Technical/Free winners:  (both)
 Mixed Duet Technical winners:  (SHI Haoyu & ZHANG Yayi) /  (SHI Haoyu & CHENG Wentao) (default)
 Free Combination winners: 
 Team Highlight winners: 
 May 31 – June 2: ASWS #8 in  Barcelona
 Solo Technical/Free winners:  Ona Carbonell /  Marta Fiedina
 Duet Technical/Free winners:  (Marta Fiedina & Anastasiya Savchuk) (both)
 Team Technical/Free winners:  (both)
 Mixed Duet Technical winners:  (Mayya Gurbanberdieva & Aleksandr Maltsev) (both)
 Free Combination winners: 
 Team Highlight winners: 
 June 14 – 16: ASWS #9 (final) in  Budapest
 Solo Technical/Free winners:  Ona Carbonell /  Marta Fiedina
 Duet Technical/Free winners:  (Marta Fiedina & Anastasiya Savchuk) (both)
 Team Technical/Free winners:  (both)
 Mixed Duet Technical/Free winners:  (Mayya Gurbanberdieva & Aleksandr Maltsev) (both)
 Free Combination winners: 
 Team Highlight winners:

2019 FINA Champions Swim Series
 April 27 & 28: CSS #1 in  Guangzhou
  won both the gold and overall medal tallies.
 May 11 & 12: CSS #2 in  Budapest
  won both the gold and overall medal tallies.
 May 31 & June 1: CSS #3 (final) in  Indianapolis
  won both the gold and overall medal tallies.

2019 FINA Swimming World Cup
 August 2 – 4: SWC #1 in  Tokyo
  won the gold medal tally.  won the overall medal tally.
 August 8 – 10: SWC #2 in  Jinan
  won the gold medal tally.  won the overall medal tally.
 August 15 – 17: SWC #3 in 
  won both the gold and overall medal tallies.
 October 4 – 6: SWC #4 in  Budapest
  won both the gold and overall medal tallies.
 October 11 – 13: SWC #4 in  Berlin
  and the  won 5 gold medals each. Hungary won the overall medal tally.
 November 1 – 3: SWC #6 in  Kazan
  won both the gold and overall medal tallies.
 November 7 – 9: SWC #7 (final) in  Doha
  won the gold medal tally.  won the overall medal tally.

Non-FINA events

2019 International Swimming League
 October 5 & 6: ISL #1 in  Indianapolis Winners:  Energy Standard
 October 12 & 13: ISL #2 in  Naples Winners:  Energy Standard 
 October 19 & 20: ISL #3 in  Lewisville Winners:  London Roar
 October 26 & 27: ISL #4 in  Budapest Winners:  London Roar
 November 16 & 17: ISL #5 in  College Park Winners:  LA Current
 November 23 & 24: ISL #6 in  London Winners:  Energy Standard
 December 20 & 21: ISL Final Match in  Las Vegas
  Energy Standard won the inaugural ISL title,  London Roar took second place.  Cali Condors finished third.

2019 Red Bull Cliff Diving World Series
 April 13: CDWS #1 in  El Nido, Palawan
 Winners:  Gary Hunt (m) /  Rhiannan Iffland (w)
 May 12: CDWS #2 in  Dublin
 Winners:  Constantin Popovici (m) /  Rhiannan Iffland (w)
 June 2: CDWS #3 in  Polignano a Mare
 Winners:  Gary Hunt (m) /  Rhiannan Iffland (w)
 June 22: CDWS #4 in  São Miguel, Azores
 Winners:  Gary Hunt (m) /  Rhiannan Iffland (w)
 July 14: CDWS #5 in  Beirut
 Winners:  Gary Hunt (m) /  Rhiannan Iffland (w)
 August 24: CDWS #6 in  Mostar
 Winners:  Constantin Popovici (m) /  Rhiannan Iffland (w)
 September 14: CDWS #7 (final) in  Bilbao
 Winners:  Gary Hunt (m) /  Rhiannan Iffland (w)

Canoeing

2020 Summer Olympics
 September 12 – 15: 2019 Canoe Sprint Olympic Test Event in  Tokyo at Sea Forest Waterway
  and  won 3 gold medals each. Hungary won the overall medal tally.
 October 23 – 27: 2019 Canoe Slalom Olympic Test Event in  Tokyo at the Canoe Slalom Course
 C1 winners:  Thomas Koechlin (m) /  Mallory Franklin (f)
 K1 winners:  Hannes Aigner (m) /  Ricarda Funk (f)

International canoe championships
 October 24 – 27: 2019 ICF Stand Up Paddling World Championships in  Qingdao
  won the gold medal tally.  won the overall medal tally.

Canoe sprint

International canoe sprint championships
 February 15 – 17: 2019 Oceania Canoe Sprint Championships in  Cambridge
 For detailed results, click here.
 July 11 – 14: 2019 European Junior & U23 Canoe Sprint Championships in  Račice
  won the gold medal tally. Belarus and  won 15 overall medals each.
 August 1 – 4: 2019 ICF Junior & U23 Canoe Sprint World Championships in  Pitești
  won both the gold and overall medal tallies.
 August 21 – 25: 2019 ICF Canoe Sprint World Championships in  Szeged
  and  won 6 gold medals each. Belarus won the overall medal tally.

2019 Canoe Sprint World Cup
 May 23 – 26: CSWC #1 in  Poznań
  won the gold medal tally.  won the overall medal tally.
 May 30 – June 2: CSWC #2 (final) in  Duisburg
  won both the gold and overall medal tallies.

Canoe slalom

International canoe slalom championships
 February 22 – 24: 2019 Oceania Canoe Slalom Championships in  Perth
 C1 winners:  Franz Anton (m) /  Jessica Fox (f)
 K1 winners:  Michal Smolen (m) /  Ricarda Funk (f)
 Mixed C2 winners:  (Warwick Draper & Sally Wright)
 May 30 – June 2: 2019 European Canoe Slalom Championships in  Pau
 C1 winners:  Benjamin Savšek (m) /  Mallory Franklin (f)
 K1 winners:  Vít Přindiš (m) /  Amálie Hilgertová (f)
 Men's C1 Team winners:  (Benjamin Savšek, Luka Božič, & Anže Berčič)
 Women's C1 Team winners:  (Mallory Franklin, Kimberley Woods, & Sophie Ogilvie)
 Men's K1 Team winners:  (Jiří Prskavec, Vít Přindiš, & Vavřinec Hradilek)
 Women's K1 Team winners:  (Marie-Zélia Lafont, Lucie Baudu, & Camille Prigent)
 July 4 – 7: 2019 European Junior and U23 Canoe Slalom Championships in  Liptovský Mikuláš
 Junior C1 winners:  Yohann Senechault (m) /  Gabriela Satková (f)
 Junior K1 winners:  Anatole Delassus (m) /  Kateřina Beková (f)
 Junior Men's C1 Team winners:  (Ľudovít Macúš, Juraj Mráz, & Juraj Dieška)
 Junior Women's C1 Team winners:  (Marta Bertoncelli, Elena Borghi, & Elena Micozzi)
 Junior Men's K1 Team winners:  (Maximilian Dilli, Paul Bretzinger, & Tillmann Röller)
 Junior Women's K1 Team winners:  (Antonie Galušková, Lucie Nesnídalová, & Kateřina Beková)
 U23 C1 winners:  Nicolas Gestin (m) /  Marjorie Delassus (f)
 U23 K1 winners:  Jakub Grigar (m) /  Tereza Fišerová (f)
 U23 Men's C1 Team winners:  (Raffaello Ivaldi, Paolo Ceccon, & Flavio Micozzi)
 U23 Women's C1 Team winners:  (Marjorie Delassus, Margaux Henry, & Ella Bregazzi)
 U23 Men's K1 Team winners:  (Mathurin Madoré, Pol Oulhen, & Malo Quéméneur)
 U23 Women's K1 Team winners:  (Amálie Hilgertová, Tereza Fišerová, & Gabriela Satková)
 July 16 – 21: 2019 ICF Junior & U23 Canoe Slalom World Championships in  Kraków
 Junior Canoe winners:  Nejc Polencic (m) /  Gabriela Satková (f)
 Junior Kayak winners:  Anatole Delassus (m) /  Antonie Galušková (f)
 Junior Team Canoe winners:  (Yohann Senechault & Adrien Fischer) (m) /  (Marta Bertoncelli & Elena Borghi) (f)
 Junior Team Kayak winners:  (Jonny Dickson & Ben Haylett) (m) /  (Emma Vuitton & Doriane Delassus) (f)
 Junior Mixed Canoe Double winners:  (Tereza Kneblova & Martin Kratochvil)
 Junior Extreme Canoe Slalom winners:  Etienne Chappell (m) /  Evy Leibfarth (f)
 U23 Canoe winners:  Nicolas Gestin (m) /  Ana Satila (f)
 U23 Kayak winners:  Pol Oulhen (m) /  Amálie Hilgertová (f)
 U23 Team Canoe winners:  (Raffaello Ivaldi & Paolo Ceccon) (m) /  (Tereza Fišerová & Eva Rihova) (f)
 U23 Team Kayak winners:  (Mathurin Madoré & Malo Quéméneur) (m) /  (Camille Prigent & Romane Prigent) (f)
 U23 Mixed Canoe Double winners:  (Jana Matulkova & Vojtech Mruzek)
 U23 Extreme Canoe Slalom winners:  Sergey Maimistov (m) /  Ana Satila (f)
 September 6 – 8: 2019 Extreme Slalom World Championships in  Prague
 Winners:  Stefan Hengst (m) /  Veronika Vojtová (f)
 September 24 – 29: 2019 ICF Canoe Slalom World Championships in  La Seu d'Urgell
 Canoe winners:  Cédric Joly (m) /  Andrea Herzog (f)
 Kayak winners:  Jiří Prskavec (m) /  Eva Terčelj (f)
 Mixed Canoe Double winners:  (Tereza Fišerová & Jakub Jáně)
 Canoe Team winners:  (Alexander Slafkovský & Michal Martikán) (m) /  (Jessica Fox & Noemie Fox) (f)
 Kayak Team winners:  (David Llorente & Samuel Hernanz) (m) /  (Mallory Franklin & Fiona Pennie) (f)
 Forerunners Team winners:  (Pierre-Antoine Tillard & David Burgos)

2019 Canoe Slalom World Cup
 June 14 – 16: #1 in  Lee Valley White Water Centre
 C1 winners:  Sideris Tasiadis (m) /  Mallory Franklin (f)
 K1 winners:  Joe Clarke (m) /  Mallory Franklin (f)
 Extreme Canoe Slalom winners:  Etienne Chappell (m) /  Alsu Minazova (f)
 June 21 – 23: #2 in  Bratislava
 C1 winners:  Franz Anton (m) /  Claire Jacquet (f)
 K1 winners:  Andrej Málek (m) /  Corinna Kuhnle (f)
 Extreme Canoe Slalom winners:  Vavřinec Hradilek (m) /  Ashley Nee (f)
 June 28 – 30: #3 in  Tacen Whitewater Course
 C1 winners:  Roberto Colazingari (m) /  Jessica Fox (f)
 K1 winners:  Giovanni De Gennaro (m) /  Stefanie Horn (f)
 Extreme Canoe Slalom winners:  Ben Hayward (m) /  Martina Wegman (f)
 August 30 – September 1: #4 in  Markkleeberg
 C1 winners:  Alexander Slafkovský (m) /  Núria Vilarrubla (f)
 K1 winners:  Vít Přindiš (m) /  Ricarda Funk (f)
 Extreme Canoe Slalom winners:  Etienne Chappell (m) /  Caroline Trompeter (f)
 September 6 – 8: #5 (final) in  Prague
 C1 winners:  Matej Beňuš (m) /  Jessica Fox (f)
 K1 winners:  Jiří Prskavec (m) /  Jessica Fox (f)

Other international canoeing events
 July 2 – 7: 2019 ICF Canoe Freestyle World Championships in  Sort, Lleida
 Kayak winners:  Dane Jackson (m) /  Hitomi Takaku (f)
 Squirt winners:  Clay Wright (m) /  Rose Wall (f)
 Open Canoe winner:  Jordan Poffenberger
 Canoe Deck winner:  Tom Dolle 
 Junior Kayak winners:  Mason Hargrove (m) /  Ottilie Robinson-Shaw (f)
 July 23 – 28: 2019 ICF Junior & U23 Wildwater Canoeing World Championships in  Banja Luka
 For results, click here.
 August 21 – 24: 2019 ICF Paracanoe World Championships in  Szeged
  and  won 3 gold medals each. Great Britain won the overall medal tally.
 September 9 – 15: 2019 ICF Canoe Ocean Racing World Championships in  Saint-Pierre-Quiberon
 Surf Ski winners:  Sean Rice (m) /  Danielle McKenzie (f)
 Junior Surf Ski winners:  Ulvard Hart (m) /  Katriana Swetish (f)
 U23 Surf Ski winners:  Joshua Fenn (m) /  Jemma Smith (f)
 September 25 – 29: 2019 ICF Wildwater Canoeing World Championships in  La Seu d'Urgell
 Canoe winners:  Louis Lapointe (m) /  Martina Satkova (f)
 Kayak winners:  Nejc Znidarcic (m) /  Phenicia Dupras (f)
 Canoe Doubles winners:  (Louis Lapointe & Tony Debray) (m) /  (Elsa Gaubert & Margot Beziat) (f)
 Canoe Team winners:  (Louis Lapointe & Tony Debray) (m) /  (Elsa Gaubert & Helene Raguenes) (f)
 Kayak Team winners:  (Nejc Znidarcic & Anze Urankar) (m) /  (Anežka Paloudova & Martina Satkova) (f)
 Men's Canoe Doubles Team winners: 
 Forerunners winner:  Jordi Teixido
 Forerunners Team winners:  (Andraz Echeverria Olguin & Joao Victor Machado Martins)
 October 17 – 20: 2019 ICF Canoe Marathon World Championships in  Shaoxing
  won both the gold and overall medal tallies.

Rowing

International rowing events
 January 26: 2019 European Rowing Indoor Championships in  Copenhagen
 For detailed results, click here.
 February 24: 2019 World Rowing Indoor Championships in  Long Beach, California
 For detailed results, click here.
 May 18 & 19: 2019 European Rowing Junior Championships in  Essen
  won both the gold and overall medal tallies.
 May 31 – June 2: 2019 European Rowing Championships in  Lucerne
  won the gold medal tally.
 July 24 – 28: 2019 World Rowing Under 23 Championships in  Sarasota-Bradenton
  and  won 6 gold medals each. Italy won the overall medal tally.
 August 7 – 11: 2019 World Rowing Junior Championships in  Tokyo
  won both the gold and overall medal tallies.
 August 25 – September 1: 2019 World Rowing Championships in  Linz-Ottensheim
  won the gold medal tally.  and the  won 10 overall medals each.
 September 7 & 8: 2019 European Rowing Under 23 Championships in  Ioannina
  won both the gold and overall medal tallies.
 September 11 – 15: 2019 World Rowing Masters Regatta in  Lake Velence
 For September 11 results, click here.
 For September 12 results, click here.
 For September 13 results, click here.
 For September 14 results, click here.
 For September 15 results, click here.

2019 World Rowing Cup
 May 10 – 12: #1 in  Plovdiv
  and the  won 4 gold medals each. China won the overall medal tally.
 June 21 – 23: #2 in  Poznań
  and  won 4 gold medals each. Australia won the overall medal tally.
 July 12 – 14: #3 (final) in  Rotterdam
  won the gold medal tally.

Sailing

International sailing events
 July 13 – 20: 2019 Youth Sailing World Championships in  Gdynia
 420 winners:  (Seb Menzies & Blake McGlashan) (m) /  (Madeline Hawkins & Yumi Yoshiyasu) (f)
 29er winners:  (Mathias Berthet & Alexander Franks-Penty) (m) /  (Berta Puig & Isabella (Bella) Casaretto) (f)
 Nacra 15 winners:  (Will Cooley & Rebecca Hancock)
 Laser Radial winners:  Yigit Yalcin Citak (m) /  Chiara Benini Floriani (f)
 RS:X winners:  Fabien Pianazza (m) /  Linoy Geva (f)
 Nations Trophy winners: 
 August 6 – 10: 2019 Women's Match Racing World Championship in  Lysekil
 Winners:  (Lucy MacGregor, Amy Sparks, Bethan Carden, Mary Rook, & Kate MacGregor)

2019 Sailing World Cup
 September 9 – 16, 2018: SWC #1 in  Enoshima
 470 winners:  (Keiju Okada & Jumpei Hokazono) (m) /  (Afrodite Zegers & Anneloes van Veen) (f)
 49er(FX) winners:  (James Peters & Fynn Sterritt) (m) /  (Martine Grael & Kahena Kunze) (f)
 Laser(Radial) winners:  Elliot Hanson (m) /  Marit Bouwmeester (f)
 RS:X winners:  Kiran Badloe (m) /  Chen Peina (f)
 Men's Finn winner:  Nicholas Heiner
 Mixed Nacra 17 winners:  (Jason Waterhouse & Lisa Darmanin)
 January 27 – February 3: SWC #2 in  Miami
 470 winners:  (Jordi Xammar & Nicolás Rodríguez García-Paz) (m) /  (Frederike Loewe & Anna Markfort) (f)
 49er(FX) winners:  (Erik Heil & Thomas Plößel) (m) /  (Martine Grael & Kahena Kunze) (f)
 Laser(Radial) winners:  Hermann Tomasgaard (m) /  ZHANG Dongshuang (f)
 RS:X winners:  YE Bing (m) /  LU Yunxiu (f)
 Men's Finn winner:  Max Salminen
 Mixed Nacra 17 winners:  (Jason Waterhouse & Lisa Darmanin)
 April 22 – 28: SWC #3 in  Genoa
 470 winners:  (Paul Snow-Hansen & Daniel Willcox) (m) /  (Fernanda Oliveira & Ana Barbachan) (f)
 49er(FX) winners:  (David Gilmour & Lachy Gilmour) (m) /  (Odile van Aanholt & Marieke Jongens) (f)
 Laser(Radial) winners:  Jonatan Vadnai (m) /  Anne-Marie Rindom (f)
 Men's Finn winner:  Jorge Zarif
 Mixed Nacra 17 winners:  (Iker Martínez de Lizarduy & Olga Maslivets)
 June 2 – 9: SWC #4 (final) in  Marseille
 470 winners:  (Mathew Belcher & William Ryan) (m) /  (Camille Lecointre & Aloise Retornaz) (f)
 49er(FX) winners:  (Federico Alonso & Arturo Alonso Tellechea) (m) /  (Julie Bossard & Aude Compan) (f)
 Laser(Radial) winners:  Giovanni Coccoluto (m) /  Viktorija Andrulytė (f)
 RS:X winners:  Mattia Camboni (m) /  Lilian de Geus (f)
 Men's Finn winner:  Andy Maloney
 Mixed Nacra 17 winners:  (Vittorio Bissaro & Maelle Frascari)
 Kiteboarding Open winner:  Nicolas Parlier

470
 January 19 – 21: 2019 470 North American Championships in  Coconut Grove Sailing Club (Miami)
 Winners:  (Panagiotis Mantis & Pavlos Kagialis) (m) /  (Camille Lecointre & Aloise Retornaz) (f)
 March 14 – 17: 2019 470 South American Championships in  Porto Alegre
 Winners:  (Ricardo Paranhos & Rodolfo Streibel) (m) /  (Fernanda Oliveira & Ana Barbachan) (f)
 May 6 – 14: 2019 470 Open European Championships in  Sanremo
 European winners:  (Anton Dahlberg & Fredrik Bergström) (m) /  (Camille Lecointre & Aloise Retornaz) (f)
 Men's Open winners:  (Mathew Belcher & William Ryan)
 June 30 – July 7: 2019 470 Junior World Championships in  Portorož
 Winners:  (Giacomo Ferrari & Giulio Calabro) (m) /  (Luise Wanser & Helena Wanser) (f)
 July 15 – 20: 2019 470 Masters Cup in  Centro Vela Alto Lario
 Apprentice winners:  (Michael Kyburz & Fabian Kuttel)
 Masters winners: 
 Grandmaster winners:  (Uti Thieme & Frank Thieme)
 Grand Grandmaster winners:  (Pieter van Laer & Michel Lefevre)
 July 23 – 30: 2019 470 Junior European Championships in  Vilagarcía de Arousa
 Open winners:  (Conrad Konitzer & Fernando Rodríguez)
 U17 winners:  (Ange Delerce & Timothee Rossi)
 Women winners:  (Theres Dahnke & Birte Winkel)
 Men's Mixed winners:  (Lucas Schlüter & Frederick Eichhorst)
 August 2 – 9: 2019 470 World Championships in  Enoshima
 Winners:  (Mathew Belcher & William Ryan) (m) /  (Hannah Mills & Eilidh McIntyre) (f)
 September 19 – 22: 2019 470 Eastern Europe Championship in  Elektrėnai
 Winners:  (Zofia Korsak & Karolina Cendrowska)

49er
 May 13 – 19: 2019 49er & 49er FX European Championship in  Weymouth
 49er winners:  (Peter Burling & Blair Tuke)
 49er FX winners:  (Martine Grael & Kahena Kunze)
 July 3 – 7: 2019 49er Junior World Championship in  Risør
 49er winners:  (Isaac McHardie & William McKenzie)
 49er FX winners:  (Alexandra Stalder & Silvia Speri)
 November 25 – 28: 2019 49er & 49er FX Oceania Championship in  Auckland
 November 29 – December 8: 2019 49er & 49er FX World Championships in  Auckland

Finn
 May 10 – 18: 2019 Finn European Championship in  Athens
 Winner:  Giles Scott
 U23 winner:  Joan Cardona
 June 7 – 14: 2019 Finn World Masters in  Skovshoved (Copenhagen)
 Winner:  Vladimir Krutskikh
 July 14 – 20: 2019 Finn Silver Sup in  Anzio
 Winner:  Oskari Muhonen
 September 11 – 15: 2019 Finn European Masters in  Schwerin
 Winner:  Filipe Silva
 December 13 – 21: 2019 Finn Gold Cup in  Melbourne

Laser
 July 2 – 9: 2019 Laser World Championship (Men's Standard) in  Sakaiminato
 Winner:  Tom Burton
 July 17 – 24: 2019 Laser Radial World Championship for Men and Women in  Sakaiminato
 Winners:  Simon de Gendt (m) /  Anne-Marie Rindom (f)
 July 24 – 31: 2019 Laser Radial Youth World Championships in  Kingston
 Boys' Gold Fleet winner:  Yigit Yalcin Citak
 Boys' Silver Fleet winner:  Nicholas Reeser
 Boys' Bronze Fleet winner:  Nathan Latka
 Girls' Fleet winner:  Matilda Nicholls
 August 16 – 23: 2019 Laser 4.7 Youth World Championships in  Kingston
 Boys' Gold Fleet winner:  Niccolo Nordera
 Boys' Silver Fleet winner:  Nicklas Høst-Verbraak
 Girls' Fleet winner:  Anja von Allmen
 September 5 – 14: 2019 Laser Masters World Championships in  Port Zélande
 Apprentice winners:  Dave Ridley (Standard) /  Jon Emmett (Radial)
 GGM winners:  Wolfgang Gerz (Standard) /  Jeff Loosemore (Radial)
 GM winners:  Carlos Martinez (Standard) /  Gilles Coadou (Radial)
 Masters winners:  Serge Kats (Standard) /  Scott Leith (Radial)
 Radial Legends winner:  Kerry Waraker
 October 26 – November 2: 2019 Laser Under-21 World Championships in  Split
 Winners:  Juan Pablo Cardozo (m) /  Wiktoria Gołębiowska (f)

Nacra 17
 March 15 – 19: 2019 Nacra 17 Asian Championship in  Shanghai (Dianshan Lake)
 Winners:  (SHI Junjie & ZHOU Qianaqian)
 May 13 – 19: 2019 Nacra 17 European Championship in  Weymouth
 Winners:  (Ben Saxton & Nicola Boniface)
 July 3 – 7: 2019 Nacra 17 Junior World Championship in  Risør
 Winners:  (Gianluigi Ugolini & Maria Giubilei)
 November 25 – 28: 2019 Nacra 17 Oceania Championship in  Auckland
 November 29 – December 8: 2019 Nacra 17 World Championship in  Auckland

RS:X
 January 21 – 23: 2019 RS:X North American Championships in  Miami
 Winners:  Louis Giard (m) /  Helene Noesmoen (f)
 April 7 – 13: 2019 RS:X European & Youth European Championships and Open Trophy in  Palma de Mallorca
 Senior winners:  Kiran Badloe (m) /  Lilian de Geus (f)
 U21 winners:  Yoav Cohen (m) /  Emma Wilson (f)
 Youth (European) winners:  Fabien Pianazza (m) /  Naama Gazit (f)
 U17 winners:  Daniel Basik Tashtash (m) /  Manon Pianazza (f)
 August 4 – 10: 2019 RS:X Windsurfing Youth World Championships in  Saint Petersburg
 Youth Medal Race winners:  Eyal Yohay Zror (m) /  Yana Reznikova (f)
 Youth Men's Gold winner:  Tomer Vardimon
 Youth Men's Silver winner:  Matthijs van Wijngaarden
 Youth Women's winner:  Dana Kosyak
 September 22 – 28: 2019 RS:X World Championship in  Torbole
 Winners:  Kiran Badloe (m) /  LU Yunxiu (f)
 U21 winners:  Tom Reuveny (m) /  Katy Spychakov (f)
 October 6 – 12: 2019 RS:X Windsurfing African Championships in  Algiers
 Winners:  Hamza Bouras (m) /  Amina Berrichi (f)

Surfing

International Surfing Association
 May 26 – June 2: 2019 ISA World Longboard Surfing Championship in  Biarritz
 Open winners:  Benoit Clemente (m) /  Alice Lemoigne (f)
 Team Points & ISA Aloha Cup winners: 
 September 7 – 15: 2019 ISA World Surfing Games in  Miyazaki
 Open winners:  Italo Ferreira (m) /  Sofía Mulánovich (f)
 Team Points winners: 
 Aloha Cup winners: 
 October 26 – November 3: 2019 ISA World Junior Surfing Championship in  Huntington Beach
 U16 winners:  Jackson Bunch (m) /  Noah Lia Klapp (f)
 U18 winners:  Dimitri Poulos (m) /  Gabriela Bryan (f)
 Aloha Cup and Team Points winners: 
 November 23 – December 1: 2019 ISA World SUP and Paddleboard Championship in  El Sunzal
 TBA: 2019 ISA World Adaptive Surfing Championship (location TBA)

2019 World Surf League
 Note 1: For the Men's 2019 schedule and detailed results, click here.
 Note 2: For the Women's 2019 schedule and detailed results, click here.
 April 3 – 13: Quiksilver Pro Gold Coast 2019 in  Gold Coast (M/W)
 Winners:  Italo Ferreira (m) /  Caroline Marks (f)
 April 17 – 27: Rip Curl Pro Bells Beach 2019 in  Bells Beach (M/W)
 Winners:  John John Florence (m) /  Courtney Conlogue (f)
 May 13 – 25: Corona Bali Protected 2019 in  Bali (M/W)
 Winners:  Kanoa Igarashi (m) /  Stephanie Gilmore (f)
 May 27 – June 9: Margaret River Pro 2019 in  Margaret River (M/W)
 Winners:  John John Florence (m) /  Lakey Peterson (f)
 June 20 – 23: Oi Rio Pro 2019 in  Saquarema (M/W)
 Winners:  Filipe Toledo (m) /  Sally Fitzgibbons (f)
 July 9 – 22: Corona Open J-Bay 2019 in  Jeffreys Bay (M/W)
 Winners:  Gabriel Medina (m) /  Carissa Moore (f)
 August 21 – September 1: Tahiti Pro Teahupo'o 2019 in  Teahupo'o (Men only)
 Winner:  Owen Wright
 September 19 – 21: Freshwater Pro 2019 in  Lemoore (M/W)
 Winners:  Gabriel Medina (m) /  Lakey Peterson (f)
 October 3 – 13: Quiksilver Pro France 2019 in  Rion-des-Landes (M/W)
 Winners:  Jérémy Florès (m) /  Carissa Moore (f)
 October 16 – 28: MEO Rip Curl Pro Portugal 2019 in  Peniche (M/W)
 Winners:  Italo Ferreira (m) /  Caroline Marks (f)
 December 8 – 20: Billabong Pipe Masters 2019 in  Banzai Pipeline (Men's Final)

Water polo

2019 FINA Men's Water Polo World League
 October 23, 2018 – March 12, 2019: 2018–19 FINA Men's European Water Polo Preliminary Rounds
 The following teams here have qualified to compete at the 2019 Men's Europa Cup Finals:
 March 26 – 31: 2019 FINA Men's Intercontinental Water Polo Tournament in  Perth
  defeated , 10–8, in the final.  took third place.
 June 18 – 23: 2019 FINA Men's Water Polo World League Superfinal in  Belgrade
  defeated , 12–11, to win their 12th FINA Men's Water Polo World League title.
  took third place.
 Note: Serbia has qualified to compete at the 2020 Summer Olympics.2019 FINA Women's Water Polo World League
 November 3, 2018 – March 5, 2019: 2018–19 FINA Women's European Water Polo Preliminary Rounds
 The following teams here have qualified to compete at the 2019 Women's Europa Cup Finals: 
 March 26 – 31: 2019 FINA Women's Intercontinental Water Polo Tournament in  Perth
 The  defeated , 14–12 in a shootout and after a 9–9 score in regular play, in the final.
  took third place.
 June 4 – 9: 2019 FINA Women's Water Polo League Superfinal in  Budapest
 The  defeated , 10–9, to win their sixth consecutive and 13th overall FINA Women's Water Polo League title.
  took third place.
 Note: The United States has qualified to compete at the 2020 Summer Olympics.''

International water polo events
 March 29 – 31: 2019 Women's Europa Cup Final in  Turin
 The  defeated , 11–9, in the final.  took third place.
 April 5 – 7: 2019 Men's Europa Cup Final in  Zagreb
  defeated , 10–8, in the final.  took third place.
 September 9 – 15: 2019 FINA World Women's Junior Water Polo Championships in  Funchal
  defeated , 11–5, to win their second consecutive and third overall FINA World Women's Junior Water Polo Championships title.
  took third place.

Ligue Européenne de Natation (Water Polo)
National teams
 August 11 – 18: 2019 LEN European Junior Water Polo Championship in  Tbilisi
  defeated , 10–6, to win their first LEN European Junior Water Polo Championship title.
  took third place.
 September 1 – 8: 2019 European Women's Junior Water Polo Championship in  Volos
  defeated , 12–11, to win their second consecutive European Women's Junior Water Polo Championship title.
  took third place.

Clubs
 September 28, 2018 – April 13, 2019: 2018–19 LEN Euro Cup
 March 30 – April 13: 2018–19 LEN Euro Cup Finals
  CN Marseille defeated  Jadran Carine, 16–15 in 2 legs, to win their first LEN Euro Cup title.
 October 17, 2018 – May 15, 2019: 2018–19 LEN Champions League Preliminary Rounds
 June 6 – 8: 2018–19 LEN Champions League Final Eight in  Hanover
  FTC Telekom Budapest defeated  Olympiacos Piraeus, 14–13, to win their first LEN Champions League title.
  Pro Recco took third place.
 November 23, 2018 – April 20, 2019: 2018–19 LEN Euro League Women
  CN Sabadell defeated  Olympiacos, 13–11, to win their fifth LEN Euro League Women title.
  NC Vouliagmeni took third place.

UANA

 January 21 – 27: 2019 UANA Water Polo Cup in  São Paulo
 Men: In the final,  defeated , 12–10.  took third place and  took fourth place.
 Women: In the final,  defeated , 18–9.

Water skiing & Wakeboarding

IWWF World Championships
 February 14 – 23: 2018 IWWF World Cable Wakeboard & Wakeskate Championships in  Buenos Aires
 Wakeboard Open winners:  Lior Sofer (m) /  Julia Rick (f)
 Seated Wakeboard Open winner:  Emanuele Pagnini
 Wakestake Open winners:  Clement de Premonville (m) /  Zuzana Vrablova (f)
 July 4 – 7: 2019 IWWF World Under 21 Waterski Championship in  Shalom Park Water Ski Site (Edmonton)
 Slalom winners:  Joel Poland (m) /  Jaimee Bull (f)
 Tricks winners:  Danylo Fil'Chenko (m) /  Anna Gay (f)
 Jump winners:  Joel Poland (m) /  Valentina Gonzalez (f)
 Overall winners:  Joel Poland (m) /  Anna Gay (f)
 July 22 – 28: 2019 IWWF World Disabled Championships in  Skarnes
 For results, click here.
 August 12 – 18: 2019 IWWF Water Ski World Championships in  Putrajaya
 Slalom winners:  Joel Howley (m) /  Manon Costard (f)
 Tricks winners:  Patricio Font (m) /  Anna Gay (f)
 Jump winners:  Ryan Dodd (m) /  Jacinta Carroll (f)
 Overall winners:  Martin Kolman (m) /  Whitney McClintock (f)
 Team Classification winners: 
 September 7 – 15: 2019 IWWF World Waterski Racing Championships in  Vichy
 Open winners:  Benjamin Gulley (m) /  Ellen Jones (f)
 F2 winners:  Lachlin Nix (m) /  Sylvia de Spiegeleire (f)
 Junior winners:  Carter Robertson (m) /  Nellie McMillan (f)
 November 19 – 23: 2019 IWWF World Wakeboard Championships in  Abu Dhabi

IWWF World Cup/Elite events
 March 6 – 11: 2019 Moomba Masters International Invitational Championships in  Melbourne
 Senior
 Overall winners:  Martin Kolman (m) /  Giannina Bonnemann (f)
 Jump winners:  Freddy Krueger (m) /  Jacinta Carroll (f)
 Slalom winners:  Thomas Degasperi (m) /  Whitney Mcclintock Rini (f)
 Tricks winners:  Martin Kolman (m) /  Anna Gay (f)
 Junior
 U17 Overall winners:  Tobias Giorgis (m) /  Sade Ferguson (f)
 U17 Jump winners:  Tobias Giorgis (m) /  Sade Ferguson (f)
 U17 Slalom winners:  Federico Jaramillo E. (m) /  Sade Ferguson (f)
 U17 Tricks winners:  Patricio Font (m) /  Neilly Ross (f)
 June 14 – 16: 2019 Bordeaux Slalom Cup in  Baurech
 Pro Slalom winner:  Robert Pigozzi
 Slalom winner:  Frederick Winter
 Amateur Slalom winner:  Pierre Cesinski
 June 22 & 23: 2019 Fungliss Pro Am in  Dommartin, Ain
 Over 35 Slalom winners:  Thomas Cabri (m) /  Christine Fäh (f; default)
 Open Slalom winners:  Frederick Winter (m) /  Jaime Metcalfe (f)
 June 28 – 30: 2019 BOTASKI Pro Am in  Seseña
 U17 Slalom winners:  Nikolaus Attensam (m) /  Marie Attensam (f; default)
 U21 Slalom winners:  Charlie Emmett (m) /  Emma Wolfisberg (f; default)
 U35 Slalom winners:  Ivan Morros Peyri (m) /  Caroline Attensam (f; default)
 Open Slalom winners:  Francisco Rodrigues (m) /  Sandra Botas Medem (f)
 Pro Men Slalom winner:  Stephen Neveu
 July 5 – 7: 2019 San Gervasio Pro Am in  San Gervasio Bresciano
 Pro Slalom winners:  Frederick Winter (m) /  Ambre Franc (f)
 U45 Slalom winners:  Genadi Guralia (m) /  Claudia Fink (f; default)
 U55 Slalom winners:  Mike Parsons (m) /  Hilary Winter (f)
 Open Slalom winners:  Nicholas Benatti (m) /  Vivienne Frei (f)
 July 9 – 11: 2019 Malibu Open France in  Lacanau
 Pro Men's Slalom winner:  William Asher
 Amateur Open Slalom winner:  Vincent Stadlbaur
 Amateur 10 – 21 Slalom winner:  Charlie Emmett
 Amateur 35 – 45 Slalom winner:  Raoul Gabriel
 Amateur 55 – 65 Slalom winner:  Patrick Guyamier
 July 12 – 14: 2019 Andy Mapple Pro Am in  Thorpe Lakes (Surrey)
 Slalom winner:  Charlie Emmett
 Pro Men's Slalom winner:  Frederick Winter
 July 18 – 20: 2019 IWWF Neom Wakeboard Cup in 
 Winners:  Daniel Nott (m) /  Dallas Friday (f)
 September 13 & 14: 2019 Malibu Open in  Charleston
 Slalom winners:  William Asher (m) /  Regina Jaquess (f)
 Jump winners:  Igor Morozov (m) /  Jacinta Carroll (f)

Other IWWF Events
 March 2 & 3: 2019 Latrobe City – Oceania Waterski Championships in  Lake Narracan (Gippsland)
 Open winners:  Archie Davis (m) /  Sade Ferguson (f)
 Over 35 winners:  John Connell (m) /  Cherie Buck (f)
 Boys' U17 Tricks winner:  Aiden Yoong Hanifah
 Girls' U17 Overall winner:  Aaliyah Yoong Hanifah (default)
 Classification winners:  (Open) /  (Over 35)
 July 18 – 21: 2019 IWWF Europe & Africa Tournament Open Championships in  Toledo
 Slalom winners:  Thomas Degasperi (m) /  Manon Costard (f)
 Tricks winners:  Aliaksei Zharnasek (m) /  Giannina Bonnemann (f)
 Jump winners:  Igor Morozov (m) /  Marie Vympranietsova (f)
 Overall winners:  Thibaut Dailland (m) /  Giannina Bonnemann (f)
 Team winners: 
 July 25 – 28: 2019 IWWF Europe and Africa Tournament Over 35 Championships in  Ioannina
 For results, click here.
 July 29 – August 4: 2019 IWWF Europe & Africa Tournament Under 21 Championships in  Dnipro
 U21 Slalom winners:  Jakob Bogne (m) /  Lea Miermont (f)
 U21 Tricks winners:  Danylo Filchenko (m) /  Stanislava Prosvetova (f)
 U21 Jump winners:  Danylo Filchenko (m) /  Marie-Lou Moulanier (f)
 U21 Overall winners:  Danylo Filchenko (m) /  Stanislava Prosvetova (f)
 August 5 – 10: 2019 IWWF Europe and Africa Wakeboard Championships in  Kyiv
 U14 winners:  Mikhail Doladov (m) /  Oleksandra Samoylenko (f)
 Junior winners:  Maxime Roux (m) /  Anna-Maria Kushkovskaya (f)
 Open winners:  Massimiliano Piffaretti (m) /  Sanne Meijer (f)
 Over 30 winners:  Yann Calvez (m) /  Emma Pickard (f)
 Over 40 winners:  Francesco Starita (m) /  Annalisa di Corato (f)
 Team Classification: 
 August 28 – September 1: 2019 IWWF Europe and Africa Tournament Youth Championships in  Roquebrune-sur-Argens
 For results, click here.
 September 23 – 29: 2019 IWWF Asian Waterski & Wakesports Championships in  Pratum Thani
 Open Wakeboard winners:  Yun Sang-hyun (m) /  Shin Hyun-jeong (f)
 Junior Wakeboard winners:  Yamato Kishida (m) /  Mio Nakagawa (f)
 October 2 – 6: 2019 IWWF Latin American Wakeboard & Wakeskate Championships in  Mairiporã
 Open winners:  Kai Ditsch (m) /  Eugenia de Armas (f)
 October 23 – 27: 2019 IWWF Pan American Senior Waterski Championships in  Bujama
 For results, click here.

See also
 2019 in sports

References

External links
 FINA – Fédération Internationale de Natation (International Swimming Federation)
 International Canoe Federation
 World Rowing
 World Sailing
 International Surfing Association
 International Waterski & Wakeboard Federation

 
2019 in sports
Water sports by year
2019 sport-related lists
Aquatics